The light heavyweight competition of the boxing events at the 2015 Pan American Games in Toronto, Ontario, Canada, was held between the 20 and 24 of July at the Oshawa Sports Centre. The defending champion was Mary Spencer of Canada. Light heavyweights is limited to those boxers weighing less than or equal to 75 kilograms.

Like all Pan American boxing events, the competition is a straight single-elimination tournament. Both semifinal losers are awarded bronze medals, so no boxers compete again after their first loss. Bouts consist of  a 3 rounds "10-point must" scoring system used in the pro game, where the winner of each round must be awarded 10 points and the loser a lesser amount. AIBA officials are waiting to see how things go in the men's game before making a decision to take headgear off women fighters. Five judges scored each bout. The winner will be the boxer who scored the most at the end of the match.

Qualification

A total of eight boxers qualified to compete.

Results

Bracket

References

Boxing at the 2015 Pan American Games